The 2006–07 Super League Greece was the 71st season of the highest football league of Greece and the inaugural under the name Super League. The season began on 19 August 2006 and ended on 13 May 2007. Olympiacos clinched the title on 22 April with their victory over Kerkyra, for their third straight title and 10th in the last 11 years.

For the next season, Ionikos, Kerkyra and Egaleo have been relegated to B' Ethniki given that they have finished in the lowest three spots of the table. Asteras Tripolis, Levadiakos and Veria was promoted from B' Ethniki for 2007–08.

Teams

Stadia and personnel

 1 On final match day of the season, played on 13 May 2007.

League table

Results

Top scorers
Source: Galanis Sports Data

See also
Super League Greece

External links
Official Site of the Supeleague Greece
Super League Greece Statistics

Super League Greece seasons
1
Greece